Cedofeita is a former civil parish in the municipality of Porto, Portugal. In 2013, the parish merged into the new parish Cedofeita, Santo Ildefonso, Sé, Miragaia, São Nicolau e Vitória.

Local landmarks include the Church of Cedofeita (dedicated to Saint Martin), the Mouzinho de Albuquerque Plaza, the Oliveira's Fountain, several chapels and modern architecture buildings. Casa da Pedra is located in Cedofeita.

People
The film director Manoel de Oliveira was born in Cedofeita in 1908. 
Cecília Meireles a member of the Assembly of the Republic of Portugal since 2009, representing the CDS – People's Party (CDS-PP), and a former Secretary of State for Tourism, was born in Cedofeita in 1977

References

Former parishes of Porto